Siete canciones populares españolas ("Seven Spanish Folksongs") is a 1914 set of traditional Spanish songs arranged for soprano and piano by the composer Manuel de Falla. Besides being Falla's most-arranged composition and one of his most popular, it is one of the most frequently performed sets of Spanish-language art songs. The set was dedicated to Madame Ida Godebska.

The styles and provenance of the songs are strikingly diverse. They are from different parts of Spain: an asturiana is from Asturias, in the north; the seguidilla, a type of flamenco, from Murcia, in the southeast, "Jota" is from Aragón in the northeast. "Nana" is a lullaby, and "Polo" a wild desire for revenge on an unfaithful lover. All the texts deal with love and the courting process, whether playfully, seriously, or tragically. The first song, for example, clearly alludes to the importance of virginity to a girl's value on the marriage market. The lullaby deals with love's outcome.

Song list
1. El paño moruno (The Moorish Cloth)
2. Seguidilla murciana
3. Asturiana 
4. Jota
5. Nana 
6. Canción
7. Polo

They have been arranged for guitar by Miguel Llobet and for orchestra by Luciano Berio. Falla and Paul Kochanski arranged six of the songs (omitting No. 2 and changing the order) for violin as Suite populaire espagnole. They inspired a similar folksong collection by Falla's friend and collaborator Federico García Lorca. Norwegian trumpet soloist Tine Thing Helseth recorded them on trumpet on her self-titled album "Tine" (2013), employing a cup mute in at the end of No. 4 and throughout No. 5.

Further reading 
 Jihyun Park, "A Study of Siete canciones populares españolas by Manuel de Falla." Ph.D. dissertation, University of Kansas, 2013.

References

Compositions by Manuel de Falla
Art songs
Spanish folk songs
Spanish-language songs
1914 compositions
1910s in Spanish music